Lynn Maurice Ferguson Arnold, AO (born 27 January 1949) is an Anglican priest and a former Australian politician, who represented the South Australian Branch of the Australian Labor Party, serving as Premier of South Australia between 4 September 1992 and 14 December 1993, during the 11 years of Labor government which ended in a landslide defeat of his government at the 1993 election.

After leaving politics, Arnold worked for World Vision from 1997 to 2007, and for Anglicare SA after March 2008. In November 2013, he was ordained as a deacon in the Anglican Church. In December 2014, he was ordained a priest in St Peter's Cathedral, Adelaide.

Political career 

Entering in Parliament as member for Salisbury on 15 September 1979, Arnold became a Minister after the election of the John Bannon Labor Government in 1982. He served as Minister of Education, Tertiary Education, Agriculture and State Development. He held the seat of Salisbury until it was abolished on 6 December 1985, and then represented Ramsay from 7 December 1985 to 11 December 1993.

Arnold was elected Labor leader and Premier of South Australia in September 1992, following the resignation of John Bannon after the $3.1 billion collapse of the State Bank of South Australia. However, the change of leader did not appease the simmering voter anger against Labor ahead of a statutory general election due for 1993. A warning sign came at the March 1993 federal election, which saw two of Labor's longest-standing federal strongholds fall to the Liberals. Hindmarsh was won by a non-Labor member for the first time since 1919 and only the second time ever, while Grey was won by the conservatives for only the second time in 50 years.

Arnold waited as long as he could, finally calling an election for 11 December. That resulted in the 11-year Labor government being swept out of office in a massive swing to the Liberal Party led by Dean Brown. Labor suffered an 8.9%, 14-seat swing, and its share of the two-party-preferred vote was reduced to 39.1%. That was mainly because Labor was decimated in its long-time stronghold in Adelaide, losing all but nine seats in the capital. Arnold was elected in the newly-created seat of Taylor.

Most commentators did not blame Arnold for the landslide defeat and believed Labor would have been heavily defeated regardless of who was leading the party. Almost a year after the election, Arnold resigned as Labor leader, and left politics. He was succeeded as Labor leader by his deputy, Mike Rann, who had earlier succeeded him in Ramsay. Arnold's resignation led to a by-election for Taylor on 5 November 1994, at which Trish White retained the seat for Labor.

Life after politics 
In August 2003, Arnold received a Ph.D. in sociolinguistics from the University of Adelaide (Graduate School of Education). In his doctoral thesis he drew a number of conclusions that were based on the study of the language of Asturianu (also known as Bable), spoken in the northern Spanish province known as the Principau d’Asturies.

Arnold was Chief Executive of the humanitarian organisation World Vision Australia from 1997 until 2003. In 2003, he was appointed Regional Vice President of World Vision International for the Asia Pacific Region, based in Bangkok, Thailand. In October 2006, he was appointed Senior Director (Board Development & Peer Review) for World Vision International, heading a team assisting World Vision boards and advisory councils in the development of their governance capacity, and also for administering peer review programs in World Vision partnerships.

On 8 December 2007, the Anglican Archbishop of Adelaide, the Most Revd Jeffrey Driver, announced Arnold's appointment as Chief Executive of Anglicare SA, and he served in that role from 18 March 2008 to 30 June 2012. He left to explore ordination to the Anglican priesthood, and was succeeded by the Reverend Peter Sandeman.

Arnold was ordained as a deacon in Adelaide in November 2013. In December 2014, he was ordained a priest by the Archbishop of Adelaide, and is currently serving as Assistant Priest at St Peter's Cathedral, Adelaide.

He was chair of the Don Dunstan Foundation from 2010 to June 2020, when Jane Lomax-Smith  was announced as the new chair. Arnold remains on the Board as Director and Patron.

References

External links 
 
 Lingua Nullius: A Retrospect and Prospect about Australia's First Languages (Mp3 Audio), Lowitja O'Donoghue Oration 2016, 31 May 2016
 Lingua Nullius: A Retrospect and Prospect about Australia's First Languages (Transcript), Lowitja O'Donoghue Oration 2016, 31 May 2016
 

|-

|-

|-

|-

Australian Labor Party members of the Parliament of South Australia
Living people
Premiers of South Australia
1949 births
University of Adelaide alumni
Leaders of the Opposition in South Australia
Australian Anglican priests
Officers of the Order of Australia